The Salwa Canal was a proposed shipping route and tourism project through Saudi Arabia along its border with Qatar, effectively turning the latter into an island. The project appears to be abandoned for the present.

Background 

In June 2017, Saudi Arabia and a number of countries cut diplomatic relations with Qatar and imposed a land, sea, and air blockade.

Proposal
The tender was scheduled to take place on 25 June 2018. According to the publication Makkah Al-Mukarramah, the company with the winning bid was to be announced within 90 days of the bid closure date, after which it was to begin digging of the channel immediately in order to complete the project within a one-year time frame.

The proposed waterway is 200 m wide and will be dug to a depth of up to 20 m providing a maximum ship draft of 12 m. This would allow the canal to accommodate cargo, container and passenger ships up to a length of 295 m. The preliminary cost has been estimated at SR2.8bn (US$747m). The proposal includes building resorts with private beaches, the construction of ports, the possibility of a free trade zone, a military zone, and a dumping ground for nuclear waste.

Saudi media report the project could be completed within 12 months, comparing it to the second, 72 km lane, of the Suez Canal which took about 12 months to finish. However, only half of the distance involved digging new waterways while the remainder was only widening existing channels.

Some media sources seem to prefer a route avoiding maritime boundary passing through Khawr al Udayd, which is a bay and nature reserve also under the Tentative List of the World Heritage Site and mostly shared in a maritime border with Qatar.

See also 

 Panama Canal
 Nicaragua Canal
 Gulf of Salwah

References 

Proposed canals
Qatar–Saudi Arabia relations
Economy of Saudi Arabia
Qatar–Saudi Arabia border